Sir Thomas Daniel McCaffrey (born 20 February 1922; died 8 July 2016), was a British former civil servant who served as Downing Street Press Secretary under James Callaghan from 1976 to 1979.

Early life 
Tom McCaffrey was born in Glasgow and educated at the local Hyndland Secondary School. Later he would attend the Jesuit St Aloysius college. He was the son of a travelling salesman, William McCaffrey and his wife Bridget (nee McCafferty). During World War II he joined the Royal Air Force and served as a wireless radio operator.

Career 
After demobilisation in 1945 he commenced his career with the civil service, eventually going on to serve as Downing Street Press Secretary for Labour prime minister James Callaghan. After the defeat of Callaghan in the 1979 general election, he went to work for the new Labour party leader, Michael Foot.

Tom McCaffrey was knighted in the 1979 dissolution honours list.

Personal life 
In 1949, he married Agnes Douglas, known as Nancy. The union bore four daughters and two sons.

References 

1922 births
2016 deaths